All Is Vanity is a 2021 British fantasy-mystery film written, produced and directed by Marcos Mereles in his directorial debut. The film stars Sid Phoenix, Yaseen Aroussi, Isabelle Bonfrer, Rosie Steel and Christopher Sherwood.

All Is Vanity had its world premiere at the 65th BFI London Film Festival on 11 October 2021, and was theatrically released in the United Kingdom on 14 October 2022.

Synopsis
An eccentric photographer, his eager assistant, a jaded make-up artist and a bored model gather for a fashion shoot in a London warehouse. But when one of their number disappears, events take a turn for the bizarre.

Cast
 Sid Phoenix as The Photographer
 Yaseen Aroussi as The Intern
 Isabelle Bonfrer as The Model
 Rosie Steel as The Makeup Artist
 Christopher Sherwood as The Film Director

Release 
All Is Vanity had its world premiere at the 65th BFI London Film Festival on 11 October 2021.

Verve Pictures acquired the rights to the film for the United Kingdom. The film was theatrically released on 14 October 2022.

Reception
The Upcoming's Umar Ali gave the film 4/5 stars, praising it as a "fascinating" surreal tale thanks to its “self-aware script, talented cast and stylish cinematography.” Joel Harley of Total Film called it a "deftly built farce", and Iana Murray of Empire Magazine defined it as "a mystery that unravels like nesting dolls".

Accolades

References

External links
 
 All Is Vanity at BFI London Film Festival

2021 comedy films
2021 directorial debut films
British fantasy comedy films